Macalister Road is a major thoroughfare in the city of George Town in Penang, Malaysia. The road stretches out of Magazine Circus next to Komtar in the city centre towards the leafier western edge of the city.

The road was named after one of the Governors of Penang in the early 19th century. Originally a dirt track, the eastern section of Macalister Road has become urbanised as part of the city centre. Notably, the westernmost section of Macalister Road still retains a quieter, greener character, with mature Angsana trees providing shade along this particular section of the road.

Etymology 
Macalister Road was named in honour of a Scotsman, Colonel Norman Macalister, who served as the Governor of the Prince of Wales Island (now Penang Island) between 1808 and 1810.

History 

During the colonial era, the Europeans tended to build their residences at Macalister Road. Tall Angsana trees were planted along the westernmost section of Macalister Road by Charles Curtis, who was the curator of the Penang Botanic Gardens in the late 19th century. In addition to the Angsana trees, a baobab tree, planted by Captain Speedy, was planted at this section of Macalister Road as well and still remains at the same spot to this day; it is one of the only three baobab trees in Penang.

Among the European residences at this particular stretch of Macalister Road are the Mayfair, Union Villa and Seri Teratai, the latter of which is the official residence of the Chief Minister of Penang. St. George's Girls School, one of the premier English schools in Penang, was relocated to its present grounds at this stretch of Macalister Road in 1954.

Further east, the King Edward VII Memorial Hospital, named after King Edward VII who was the British monarch between 1901 and 1910, was completed in 1915. This maternity hospital was in operation until 1955; the building now houses a branch of the Penang State Museum and Art Gallery.

In 2013, a thunderstorm led to the collapse of the spire of Menara Umno, a high-rise at the eastern section of Macalister Road.

Landmarks 
 Seri Teratai
 King Edward VII Memorial Hospital (now Penang State Museum and Art Gallery branch)
 Sun Yat-sen Memorial Centre

Education 

St. George's Girls' School
 St. Christopher's International Primary School
 Hua Xia International School
DISTED College

Health care 

Loh Guan Lye Specialists Centre
Island Hospital

See also 
 List of roads in George Town

References 

Roads in Penang
George Town, Penang